Friedrich Preller (the Younger) (1 September 1838 in Weimar – 21 October 1901 in Blasewitz) was a German land and seascape painter.

Life 
He was the youngest son of the painter, etcher and art professor Friedrich Preller the Elder. From the age of thirteen, he worked in his father's studio, where he received his first lessons. In 1859, he travelled to Italy with his father and, in 1862, undertook several excursions to the coast of Sicily and Naples to see the original landscapes he had read about in the Odyssey.

In 1864, he took another trip to Italy, returning to Dresden in 1866, where he established his own studio. Ten years later, he enjoyed his first artistic successes and began attracting commissions. In 1880, he became a professor at the Dresden Academy of Fine Arts. He continued to travel extensively, taking study trips to Rügen and Greece as well as Italy.

Most of his larger works were destroyed during the fire-bombing of Dresden in 1945. The loss included a series of murals on Greek mythological themes (Oedipus, Achilles, Hercules and the Golden Fleece) in the Semperoper; and others depicting Prometheus in the Albertinum.

His daughter Lucie married the sculptor Richard König. Together, they wrote a biography of her father, including texts that Preller himself had written as a young man.

Writings 

 Friedrich Preller der Jüngere, Max Jordan (ed.): Tagebücher des Künstlers (Diaries of the Artists), Kaufbeuren, 1904 Munich

References

Further reading 
 Richard König, Lucie König : Friedrich Preller d. J.: Eine Künstlerjugend. A. Duncker, Weimar 1930.
 Otto Roquette: Friedrich Preller: ein Lebensbild. Rütten & Loenig, Frankfurt 1883.

External links 

 Friedrich Preller @ Zeno.org
 Friedrich Preller der Jüngere @ BAM
 Friedrich Preller der Jüngere @ artfacts.net

1838 births
1901 deaths
German marine artists
19th-century German painters
19th-century German male artists
German male painters